3S may refer to:
 3S, for single, seventies/1970s, stuck, a slang form of sheng nu, a derogatory Chinese term referring to unmarried women in their mid to late twenties
 3S gondola lift
 3-S treatment, a method for dealing with unwanted or unwelcome animals in rural areas
 3S, a series of Toyota S engines
 Air Antilles Express IATA airline designator
 3S Supersonic gas separation, a brand name for a gas processing technology
 The S line of the Mazda3 automobile
 Threes (video game)
 In Geoinformatics, 3S means the combination of~ 
Geographic information system
Global Positioning System
Remote sensing

See also
 Three (disambiguation)